The 2014 Nordic Figure Skating Championships was held from February 26 to March 2, 2014 at the Gränby Ishallar in Uppsala, Sweden. Skaters competed in the disciplines of men's singles and ladies' singles on the senior, junior, and novice levels.

Senior results

Men

Ladies

References

External links
 official site
 results
 announcement

Nordic Figure Skating Championships
Nordic Figure Skating Championships
Nordic Championships, 2014
2014 in Swedish sport